Warren Bruno (died 2012) was a restaurateur in Atlanta and a community leader in Atlanta's Virginia-Highland neighborhood.

In 1983, Bruno bought the Atkins Park Restaurant in Virginia-Highland. Bruno operated a total of 12 restaurants and bars in Metro Atlanta. He was a co-founder of the Buckhead Village Merchants Association and the Virginia-Highland Business Association.

The Virginia-Highland Summerfest festival began as a block party with Bruno and other local businesses in 1984. The party took place between St. Charles and Greenwood Avenues along N. Highland Avenue and was intended to bring together local businesses and residents.

References

External links
"Warren Bruno: In Memoriam", Virginia-Highland Voice, May 2012
"Remembering Warren Bruno", by Atlanta INtown founder Chris Schroeder (6-1-12)</em>
"A Neighbor Like Warren Bruno: A tribute to Atkins Park owner and beloved community man Warren Bruno", by Lola Carlisle with support from Karri Hobson-Pape, Jack White and Judy Potter, in the Virginia-Highland/Druid Hills Patch (5-17-12) Also published in The Virginia-Highland Voice
"Remembering Warren Bruno", by Jack White in the Virginia-Highland/Druid Hills Patch
"Warren Bruno of Atkins Park, Ormsby’s Dies After Battle With Cancer", Virginia-Highland/Druid Hills Patch (5-16-12)
"Atkins Park celebrates 90 years with Prohibition themed events", Atlanta Journal-Constitution (2-16-12)
"Community Spirit: Atkins Park Owner Warren Bruno", Atlanta INtown (9-1-11)
"Warren Bruno: Summerfest's founder looks back at 25 years of festivals" Virginia-Highland Voice (Summer 2008)
" Bio from Camden Commercial Real Estate site

Businesspeople from Atlanta
American restaurateurs
2012 deaths
Year of birth missing